The 2021–22 Western Illinois Leathernecks men's basketball team represents Western Illinois University in the 2021–22 NCAA Division I men's basketball season. The Leathernecks, led by second-year head coach Rob Jeter, played their home games at Western Hall in Macomb, Illinois, as members of the Summit League. They finished the regular season 16–15, 7–11 in Summit League play to finish in a tie for sixth place. As the No. 6 seed in the Summit League Tournament, they lost Oral Roberts in the quarterfinals. They received an invitation to The Basketball Classic postseason tournament, formerly known as the CollegeInsider.com Tournament.

Previous season
In a season limited due to the ongoing COVID-19 pandemic, the Leathernecks finished the 2020–21 season 7–15, 5–9 in Summit League play to finish in seventh place. They lost to South Dakota in the quarterfinals of the Summit League tournament.

Roster

Schedule and results

|-
!colspan=12 style=| Exhibition

|-
!colspan=12 style=| Regular season

|-
!colspan=9 style=|Summit League tournament

|-
!colspan=9 style=| The Basketball Classic

Source

References

Western Illinois Leathernecks men's basketball seasons
Western Illinois Leathernecks
Western Illinois Leathernecks men's basketball
Western Illinois Leathernecks men's basketball
Western Illinois